Carpinus tropicalis is a species of tree native to central and southern Mexico, Guatemala, El Salvador, Honduras, and Nicaragua.

Description

Range and habitat
In Mexico it is found in scattered locations in the Sierra Madre Oriental, Trans-Mexican Volcanic Belt, Sierra Madre de Oaxaca, southern Sierra Madre Occidental, Sierra Madre del Sur, Chiapas Highlands, and Sierra Madre de Chiapas. It is also found in the highlands of Guatemala, El Salvador, Honduras, and Nicaragua.

It is characteristic cloud forest tree, and is also found in oak, pine–oak, and pine forests, between 1,000 and 2,700 meters elevation.

References

Cloud forest flora of Mexico
Flora of the Sierra Madre del Sur
Flora of the Sierra Madre de Oaxaca
Flora of the Trans-Mexican Volcanic Belt
Flora of the Sierra Madre Occidental
Flora of the Chiapas Highlands
Sierra Madre de Chiapas
Flora of the Central American montane forests
Flora of the Central American pine–oak forests
Trees of Mexico
Trees of Guatemala
Trees of El Salvador
Trees of Honduras
Trees of Nicaragua
Trees of Southern Mexico
Trees of Central Mexico
Trees of Southwestern Mexico
tropicalis